Nanjing Sanmin is a metro station in Taipei, Taiwan served by Taipei Metro.

Station overview
This two-level, underground station has an island platform. It is located beneath Nanjing East Rd. at its intersection with Sanmin Rd. It opened in November 2014 with the opening of the Songshan Line.

Construction
It has four exits, two vent shafts, and two accessibility elevators.

Public Art
The theme for this station is "Gate of the City". The station represents the intersection of four developing regions of the city, all at different stages. Each exit has a gate leading to a different corner of the city. The entrance is a "Porch of Community".

Station layout

Around the station
 Puppetry Art Center of Taipei

References

2014 establishments in Taiwan
Railway stations opened in 2014
Songshan–Xindian line stations